"Peacebone" is a single (and later an EP) by American experimental pop band Animal Collective, released on August 13, 2007 by Domino Records. It was issued in advance of the group's 2007 album, Strawberry Jam, which was released in September of that year. The single version contains "Safer" as a B-side, while the EP contains two additional remixes of "Peacebone" by Black Dice and Pantha du Prince, respectively.

Formats
There are three different versions of the single. The 10" vinyl features the B-side "Safer", a live favorite during the Collective's Strawberry Jam concerts in 2005 and 2006. The 12" vinyl contains two remixes of the title track, one by Black Dice and another by Pantha du Prince. Finally, the CD is a collection of both vinyl releases, and is considered by the record label to be an EP.

Song content
The word being spoken throughout the song was confirmed by band member Deakin on the Collected Animals message board to be "bonefish". The sample appears to be taken from the Cornell Lab of Ornithology's online media archive.
About the further lyrical content, Avey Tare said in an Interview with BBC:

Music video
The accompanying video for the song "Peacebone" was created by Timothy Saccenti. It makes many references to the film Aliens, and tells a love story between a Xenomorph-like creature and a girl.

Track listing

References

2007 singles
Animal Collective songs
2007 songs
Domino Recording Company singles